Swahili culture is the culture of the Swahili people inhabiting the Swahili coast. This littoral area encompasses Tanzania, Kenya, and Mozambique, as well as the adjacent islands of Zanzibar and Comoros and some parts of  Malawi. They speak Swahili as their native language, which belongs to the Bantu language family. Graham Connah described Swahili culture as at least partially urban, mercantile, literate, and Islamic.

Swahili culture is the product of the history of the coastal part of the African Great Lakes region. As with the Swahili language, Swahili culture has a Bantu core that has borrowed from foreign influences.

History and identity

The medieval sites along the Swahili coast represent a cultural tradition with diverse local traditions that can be traced to the ninth century. This has developed into the modern Swahili culture. Currently, there are 173 identified settlements that flourished along the Swahili coast and nearby Islands from the ninth to the seventeenth centuries, which include the sites of Kilwa, Malindi, Gedi, Pate, Comoros and Zanzibar. The most recent excavations at these coastal sites have been used to examine the spread of Islam in East Africa and the development of the Swahili culture. However, the identity of the Swahili, as well as, the people associated with and the development of the culture along the Swahili coast of has been in dispute in both the past and present. The historic use of coral among the Swahili in construction, who used stone as construction material for mosques and tombs, has been associated with the emergence of the use of coral stone for construction in the fourteenth century along the coast for the buildings ascribed with the most importance. Conversely, it has been stated that the sites were founded by Arab or Persian colonists.

Many claims have been made that Swahili culture emerged from the settlement of Arab merchants with the ruins being called Arab cities and many Swahili self-identifying as descendants of Arabs or Persians. However, more recent opinions believe that the medieval Swahili coastal sites developed locally with the creation of small agricultural and fishing communities that gave rise to the Swahili culture through trade which resulted in an increase in Islamic influence during the twelfth century. Increased contact with the Islamic world then led to the integration of local African and Arab traditions, creating an indigenous Swahili culture. Yet, a blend of these two interpretations exists with accounts of Arab merchants marrying local women, which created a distinctive Arab-African Swahili culture. The culture appears to have emerged in Kenya and Tanzania and eventually spread to Mozambique.

The early Swahili city-states followed Islam and were cosmopolitan and politically independent of each other. The chief exports of these cultures were salt, slaves, ebony, gold, ivory, and sandalwood. These city-states began to decline towards the sixteenth century, mainly as a consequence of the advent of the Portuguese. Eventually, Swahili trading centers went out of business and commerce between Africa and Asia on the Indian Ocean collapsed.

Aspects of Swahili culture are diverse due to its many influences. For example, Swahili cuisine has influences from Indian and Arabic cultures. There are also alterations to certain dishes due to religious reasons. Some food items common in everyday lives of the Swahili are fish, tropical fruits, and exotic spices.

Historic Swahili culture was intensely urban and dominated by a strict class structure.

Arts and crafts

Another cultural aspect of the Swahili is their use of arts and crafts, which they find significance in. When creating art, they express themselves through creativity as well as through shape and function. Some multicultural influences can be seen in Swahili art, furniture, and architecture. They do not often use designs with images of living beings due to their Muslim heritage. Instead, Swahili designs are primarily geometric. There are important clothes that are part of their arts and crafts such as the Kanga. The Kanga is not only a rectangular piece of cloth but is an artifact of the Swahili culture. The cloth should be made with extreme care. If the cloth doesn’t match the season then it doesn’t deserve to be a Kanga and can be used as a baby diaper or an apron for the kitchen. Even though the Kanga is quite cheap, it is still a main part of Swahili culture. The Kanga is made in Tanzania and is mostly appealing to women rather than men but men are not restricted to using it. The cloth is used as a sling to carry babies, melons on their heads and can also be used as a kitchen apron.

Music
The most typical musical genre of Swahili culture is taarab (or tarabu), sung in the Swahili language. Its melodies and orchestration have Arab and Indian influences (although Western instruments, such as guitars, are sometimes used).

In the 20th century several musical genres have emerged in the Swahili world, that are derivatives of Western popular music. One major example is muziki wa dansi, which is the Tanzanian counterpart of Congolese soukous (rumba). In the last decades of the century, most Swahili music has been in the afropop vein. This includes several local derivatives of American hip hop (e.g. bongo flava).

Literature

See also
 Zanzibari cuisine
 Liongo

References

 
Kenyan culture
Islam in Africa
Archaeology of Eastern Africa